
Kecskés is a Hungarian language surname, which means "goatherd", derived from the Hungarian kecske, meaning "goat". Variants of the name include Ketskés, Kechkés and Checicheș. The name may refer to:

István Kecskés (linguist) (born 1948), Hungarian linguist
Tamás Kecskés (born 1986), Hungarian football player

See also
Kecskéd, Hungary
Kecskés (river), Hungary

References

Hungarian-language surnames
Hungarian words and phrases